Barzavand Rural District is a rural district (dehestan) in the Central District of Ardestan County, Isfahan Province, Iran. At the 2006 census, its population was 3,943, in 1,324 families.  The rural district has 23 villages.

References 

Rural Districts of Isfahan Province
Ardestan County